Jón Stefán Sveinsson, better known as "Nonni" (16 November 1857 in Möðruvellir in Hörgárdalur – 16 October 1944 in Cologne) was an Icelandic children's writer and member of the Society of Jesus.

He left Iceland in 1870 for France, where he converted to Catholicism. His children's stories concerning a character named Nonni are well known in Iceland and parts of Europe. Nonni's House (Nonnahús) his childhood home in Akureyri is now a museum to his life and works and he has featured on postage stamps. Jón Sveinsson's stories of growing up with his brother Ármann, nicknamed "Manni", were adapted into the television series Nonni and Manni.

Bibliography
Titles are currently listed in German.

 Nonni 
 Nonni und Manni 
 Sonnentage
 Die Stadt am Sund 
 Abenteuer auf den Inseln
 Auf Skipalon
 Nonni erzählt
 Zwischen Eis und Feuer
 Wie Nonni das Glück fand 
 Aus Island. Erlebnisse und Erinnerungen. Freiburg, Herder 1913
 Die Feuerinsel im Nordmeer
 Nonnis Reise um die Welt Band 1: Nonni in Amerika Band 2: Nonni in Japan

External links
Postage stamp with bio
Akureyri site with brief mention
Nonni House museum in Akureyri

1857 births
1944 deaths
Icelandic Roman Catholics
Converts to Roman Catholicism
Icelandic Jesuits
Jon Sveinsson
Icelandic women children's writers